Ranga is a rural locality on Flinders Island in the local government area of Flinders in the North-east region of Tasmania. The 2016 census determined a population of 48 for the state suburb of Ranga.

History
Ranga is a confirmed suburb/locality.

Geography
Strzelecki National Park forms most of the southern boundary.

Road infrastructure
The B85 route (Lady Barron Road Road) enters from the north-west and runs through the village to exit in the east. Route C805 (Coast Road) starts at an intersection with B85 in the village and runs south-east until it exits. Route C806 (Trousers Point Road) starts at an intersection with B85 in the west and runs south until it exits.

References

Flinders Island
Towns in Tasmania